Polk Township is an inactive township in St. Clair County, in the U.S. state of Missouri.

Polk Township was erected in 1841, taking its name from President James K. Polk (1795-1849).

References

Townships in Missouri
Townships in St. Clair County, Missouri